Chettikulum is a panchayat village in Perambalur district, Tamil Nadu, India. It is home to the famous 
Ekambareswarar and Thandayuthapani temples.

References

Villages in Perambalur district